Wendy Smith may refer to:

Wendy Smith (singer), English singer and guitarist in the band Prefab Sprout
Wendy Smith (politician), member of the Victorian Legislative Council
Dr. Wendy Smith (Seaquest DSV), one of the main characters of seaQuest DSV season 2
Wendy Jo Smith, American rap-artist, singer, and comedian

See also
Wendy Smith-Sly (born 1959), former British athlete